Corrigan-Camden Independent School District is a public school district based in Corrigan, Texas (USA).

In addition to Corrigan, the district serves the census-designated place of Pleasant Hill, and a section of the city of Seven Oaks, as well as the unincorporated communities of Camden and Moscow.

In 2009, the school district was rated "academically acceptable" by the Texas Education Agency.

History
The district changed to a four day school week in fall 2020.

Schools
Corrigan-Camden High School (Grades 9–12)
Corrigan-Camden Junior High School (Grades 7–8)
Corrigan-Camden Elementary School (Grades 4–6)
Corrigan-Camden Primary School (Grades PK–3)

References

External links

School districts in Polk County, Texas